Roxane Wilson (born 1965) is a South African actress best known for her roles in Water Rats, Stingers and The Alice. She was born in Durban, South Africa to an Italian mother and an English father. She lives in Los Angeles with her children.

Biography

Early life 

Roxane was born in Durban in 1965 to an Italian mother and an English father. Her father was also an actor, trained at the Old Vic in London.

In 1972, Roxane moved with her mother to Sydney via London. Her stepfather is Ian "Peewee" Wilson, leader and founding member of the Australian rock and roll band The Delltones.

After a couple of years in suburban Sydney, touring with the band, her family moved to Eungai Creek, New South Wales on the mid-north coast, where they maintained a fifty-acre farm, growing organic vegetables.

Career 

Roxane Wilson started her career at an early age with modelling. In 1981 she signed with the Chadwick Models agency in Sydney.

In 1983 she extended her modelling career to New York, where she signed with Wilhelmina Models and lived for three years. During her time in New York she studied acting at HB Studio and the Meisner technique with Robert Modica.

On return to Australia, she began her career as a professional actress. In 1991 she furthered her training by attending full-time study at Western Australian Academy of Performing Arts

Roxane works extensively in film, television and theatre. She has also made television appearances as a presenter for the AFI Awards and as a guest on the Good Morning Australia, Donnie Sutherland's "Sounds", "In Melbourne Today" (GTV 9) and Bert Newton Show.

She has also worked as a tutor and as a private acting coach at Screenwise, Out of the Blue and ATYP.

In 2014 she appeared in the Australian Theatre Company's Los Angeles production of Holding the Man opposite Cameron Daddo, Adam J. Yeend and Nate Jones; the production was directed by Larry Moss and received strong critical praise.

Filmography and theatre

References

External links 

 
 
 Sue Barnett & Associates, Roxane Wilson's biography
 Roxane Wilson's biography on the official Punishment website

1965 births
Living people
Australian television actresses
Australian film actresses
Actresses from Sydney